Josiah Butler (December 4, 1779 – October 27, 1854) was an American politician and a United States Representative from New Hampshire.

Early life
Born in Pelham, New Hampshire, Butler attended the Londonderry and Atkinson academies and was instructed by private tutors. He graduated from Harvard University in 1803, and taught school in Virginia for three years. He then studied law with Clifton Claggett of Amherst and Governor Cabot of Virginia and was admitted to the bar of Virginia in 1807.

Career
Upon his return to Pelham, Butler commenced practice in 1807, then moved to Deerfield, Rockingham County, New Hampshire in 1809. He served as the sheriff of Rockingham County, New Hampshire from (1810–1813) and then the clerk of the court of common pleas. An unsuccessful candidate for election in 1812 to the Thirteenth Congress, he was a member of the New Hampshire House of Representatives in 1814 - 1816.

Elected as a Democratic-Republican to the Fifteenth Congress and reelected to the Sixteenth and Seventeenth Congresses, Butler served as United States Representative for the state of New Hampshire from (March 4, 1817 – March 3, 1823). In Congress, he served as chairman, Committee on Agriculture (Seventeenth Congress). After leaving Congressional service, he served as an associate justice of the New Hampshire Court of Common Pleas 1825–1835.

Death
Butler died in Deerfield on  October 27, 1854 (age 74 years, 327 days). He is interred in Granite Cemetery, South Deerfield, Rockingham County, New Hampshire, USA.

Family life
Son of Nehemiah and Lyndia Wood, Butler married Hannah Jenness and they had ten children, DeWitt Clinton, Horace, Josiah W., Elizabeth H., Lydia J., Franklin I., Franklin Jenness, Wentworth S., Caroline L., and Mary J.

References

External links

1779 births
1854 deaths
People from Pelham, New Hampshire
Harvard University alumni
Democratic-Republican Party members of the United States House of Representatives from New Hampshire
New Hampshire sheriffs
Pinkerton Academy alumni